Come Back to Erin is a 1914 American silent film produced by Gene Gauntier Feature Players and distributed by Warner's Features. it was directed by Sidney Olcott with himself, Gene Gauntier and Jack J. Clark in the leading roles.

Cast
 Gene Gauntier as Peggy O'Malley
 Jack. J Clark as Jerry
 Sidney Olcott as Peggy's Father

Production notes
 The film was shot in New York city, in Ireland, in Killarney and Beaufort, County Kerry and in Queenstown (now Cobh), co Cork.

References
 Michel Derrien, Aux origines du cinéma irlandais: Sidney Olcott, le premier oeil, TIR 2013.

External links

 Come Back To Erin website dedicated to Sidney Olcott
Come Back To Erin at Irish Film & TV Research Online
First reel of the film restored at YouTube

1914 films
American silent short films
American black-and-white films
Films set in Ireland
Films shot in Ireland
Films shot in New York (state)
Films directed by Sidney Olcott
1914 romantic drama films
American romantic drama films
1910s American films
Silent romantic drama films
Silent American drama films